Chris Renaud may refer to:
 Chris Renaud (ice hockey) (born 1960), Canadian ice hockey defenceman
 Chris Renaud (animator) (born 1966), American illustrator and film-maker
 Chris Renaud (swimmer) (born 1976), Canadian backstroke swimmer